Amfikleia–Elateia is a municipality in the Phthiotis regional unit, Central Greece, Greece. The seat of the municipality is the town of Kato Tithorea. The municipality has an area of 533.32 km2.

Municipality
The municipality of Amfikleia–Elateia was formed after the 2011 local administration reform by the merger of the following three former municipalities that became municipal units:
Amfikleia
Elateia
Tithorea

People 
 Costa Cordalis (1944-2019), German-Greek singer

References

Municipalities of Central Greece
Populated places in Phthiotis